Dhuwakot is a Village in Nilkhantha Ward 14 in the Bagmati Province of central Nepal. In 1991 Nepal census, it had a population of 4270 with 781 houses in it. Such as Mirkot, Gaikhur, Palumtar are the neighbouring VDCs of Dhuwakot VDC.There are mainly Naharki's(नहर्की) caste is more in an average than others.

References

Populated places in Dhading District